Poropuntius margarianus is a species of ray-finned fish in the genus Poropuntius which is found in an eastern tributary of the Irrawaddy River in Yunnan and Myanmar.

References 

margarianus
Taxa named by John Anderson (zoologist)
Fish described in 1879